Law Siu On (born 8 May 1964) is a Hong Kong former cyclist. He competed in the individual road race and the team time trial events at the 1984 Summer Olympics.

References

External links
 

1964 births
Living people
Hong Kong male cyclists
Olympic cyclists of Hong Kong
Cyclists at the 1984 Summer Olympics
Commonwealth Games competitors for Hong Kong
Cyclists at the 1986 Commonwealth Games
Place of birth missing (living people)